Sue Clowes (born 31 October 1957) is an English textile and fashion designer known for the collection that launched Boy George and Culture Club in 1981.

Childhood and early life 

Sue Clowes (Susan Ellen Patricia Clowes) was born on 31 October 1957 in Islington, London, England to William Reginald Clowes and Ellen Atkins.

Education 

Clowes attended Camberwell School of Arts and Crafts to study textile design and screen printing.

Career

Textiles and fashion 

In 1979, Clowes began her career selling her printed clothing on a stall at Camden Lock Market.
Jon Baker helped her expand when he bought everything she had on her stall to stock his shop Axiom in The Great Gear Market, King's Road. She opened a shop in Kensington Market and began manufacturing clothes and accessories.
Throughout Clowes's career, music and musicians have radically influenced her work: Culture Club approached her to design a collection for the group to sell in the shop The Foundry in Ganton Street where George O'Dowd (later widely known as Boy George) worked as a window dresser. Clowes created a cultural cocktail of offbeat imagery with religious undertones. Her idea portrayed in the Culture Club look was that wherever you are in the world, whatever your culture or religion "we are all part of one club called the human race".
The Flesh and Steel collection of winter 1983 of printed silver crosses was worn by Jonny Slut of Specimen. Susanne Bartsch, an event producer provided early exposure for British designers with a series of shows in New York and then Tokyo. Clowes took part alongside other 1980s designers, including Leigh Bowery. In May 2010, Boy George was portrayed on film by actor Douglas Booth in the BBC2 drama documentary Worried About the Boy. The actors wore original vintage pieces in the film by Clowes. In April 2012, Kylie Minogue wore one of Sue Clowes vintage t-shirts for the Anti Tour.

Research and development 

Clowes moved to Italy in 1987, and became involved in wearable technology or "smart clothing". Clowes worked in an academic team called Grado Zero Espace, with Italian engineers and scientists, to pioneer clothing that incorporated technology. These garments won awards from Time and Popular Science. She also worked on the project of shape-memory alloy named Nitinol to obtain the first woven fabric. Clowes worked on the team that researched and developed a jacket padded with Aerogel. The jacket called Absolute Zero was taken on an Antarctic expedition. 
For Corpo Nove, Clowes researched Stinging Nettle fibres which were woven to produce jeans. She gave a conference at the Eden Project and at the European Textile Network Conference on "New Technologies and Materials".

Journalism 

Clowes wrote articles for an Italian magazine called N9VE and interviewed Aliona Doletskaya (editor of the Russian Vogue), Sir James Dyson (vacuum cleaner magnate), Steve Pyke (MBE photographer), Dr. Pierre Brisson (head of European Space Agency Technology Transfer), and Sir Timothy Smit (creator of the Eden Project, Cornwall, England) among others.

Recent work 

Clowes is an External Examiner for University of Wales Examination Board Commission Assessments of students attending a BA programme in "Fashion, Design and Costume" at Accademia Italiana Moda in Florence and Rome. She re-launched the Sue Clowes brand in 2012 together with her daughter Marta Melani. The original Sue Clowes outfits from the Culture Club years will be on show in the V&A Museum "Club to Catwalk" exhibition from July 2013 until February 2014.

External links 
 Sue Clowes Limited
 Archive online gallery

References 

English fashion designers
British women fashion designers
1957 births
Living people
Alumni of Camberwell College of Arts